Hum Se Na Takrana is a 1990 Indian Hindi-language action film produced and directed by Deepak Bahry, it stars Dharmendra, Shatrughan Sinha, Mithun Chakraborty, Anita Raj, Kimi Katkar in lead roles.

Plot
The film portrays a young former losing all his land through a forged contract.

Cast
Dharmendra as Amar
Shatrughan Sinha as Badshah
Mithun Chakraborty as Inspector Vijay
Anita Raj as Sundari
Kimi Katkar as Bade Thakur's Daughter
Aruna Irani as Chand Bibi
Dinesh Thakur as Bhola / Jwala Singh
Rohini Hattangadi as Ganga
Ranjeet as Shamsher
Sharat Saxena as Ranveer
Raza Murad as Chhote Thakur / Judge
Om Shivpuri as Bade Thakur
Jagdeep as Chhote Babu
Huma Khan as Dancer / Singer
Leena Das as Dancer / Singer

Soundtrack

References

External links
 
 Hum Se Na Takrana. ibosnetwork.com.

1990 films
1990s Hindi-language films
Films scored by Laxmikant–Pyarelal
Films about bears
Films directed by Deepak Bahry